Thomas Pendry, Baron Pendry,  (10 June 1934 – 26 February 2023) was a British Labour politician and member of the House of Lords. He was previously the Labour member of parliament for Stalybridge and Hyde from 1970 to 2001. In 2000, prior to his retirement as an MP he was made a member of the Privy Council on the recommendation of Tony Blair. After the 2001 election he was elevated to the peerage on 4 July as Baron Pendry, of Stalybridge in the County of Greater Manchester. He was president of the Football Foundation Ltd and was formerly sports advisor to Tameside District Council Sports Trust.

Early life
Pendry was born in Broadstairs, Kent on 10 June 1934. In an article in Cheshire Life magazine in June 2004, Pendry revealed that he was born in relatively comfortable circumstances, attending school at St Augustine's Abbey. He worked as a trade union officer for NUPE, and as an engineer.

Political career
Pendry was a councillor on Paddington Borough Council in London from 1962 to 1965 (when the borough was abolished), representing Harrow Road South. He was elected to Parliament in 1970 for Stalybridge and Hyde, which at the time covered areas in Cheshire and Lancashire, and subsequently became part of Greater Manchester. He served as an opposition whip between 1971 and 1974.

Callaghan government
In James Callaghan's administration between 1976 and 1979 Pendry served as a junior Lord Commissioner of the Treasury (assistant government whip) and subsequently as Parliamentary Under-Secretary of State for Northern Ireland.

Opposition
In 1979 he returned to the backbenches, until he was appointed to the post of Shadow Minister for Sport and Tourism by John Smith, a position he held until 1997. When the Labour government came to power in 1997, Pendry was the only member of the shadow team not to be appointed to a government post.

Sport
Lord Pendry had a love of sport that he developed during National Service with the Royal Air Force. He was appointed President of the Football Foundation in February 2003 and continued to serve in this capacity up until his death in 2023. A young Pendry learnt boxing at the hands of a Benedictine monk, becoming an Oxford Blue and boxing for the RAF.

Other interests
Pendry was a member of the Lords and Commons Cigar Club. From June to September 2018, he sat on the Regenerating Seaside Towns and Communities Committee. His memoir, Taking It on the Chin, was published in 2016.

Death
Pendry died on 26 February 2023, at the age of 88.

Honours and arms
On 21 July 1995, the Labour-controlled Tameside Metropolitan Borough Council, the local authority which had administered the area covered by the Stalybridge and Hyde constituency since 1974, made Pendry an honorary freeman of the borough. At the same time, the council granted him the lordship of the manor of Mottram in Longdendale. Tameside Council have also named part of Trinity Street in front of the old Stalybridge market hall, Lord Pendry Square. A local football club, Stalybridge Celtic, have named one of their stands The Lord Tom Pendry Stand.

References

External links
The Stamford Group
Arrowcroft plc
The Football Foundation
Tameside Sports Trust

1934 births
2023 deaths
Labour Party (UK) MPs for English constituencies
Labour Party (UK) life peers
Members of the Privy Council of the United Kingdom
People from Broadstairs
People from Stalybridge
UK MPs 1970–1974
UK MPs 1974
UK MPs 1974–1979
UK MPs 1979–1983
UK MPs 1983–1987
UK MPs 1987–1992
UK MPs 1992–1997
UK MPs 1997–2001
Northern Ireland Office junior ministers
Royal Air Force airmen
Members of the Parliament of the United Kingdom for Stalybridge and Hyde
Life peers created by Elizabeth II
Place of death missing